King Otto of Greece was deposed in a popular insurrection in October 1862. Starting on 18 October in Vonitsa, it soon spread to other cities and reached Athens on 22 October.

Background
Soon, the revolt started to spread to Santorini, Hydra, Tripoli and Messenia. However, the royal authorities quickly managed to restore control and the revolt was suppressed by 20 March.

The revolution
On 16 October, King Otto and Queen Amalia left for a royal visit to Peloponnese in order to strengthen the bonds between the Greek people and the crown. However, a new insurrection erupted two days later in Vonitsa, on the Ambracian Gulf, led by Dimitrios Voulgaris, Konstantinos Kanaris and Benizelos Roufos. Soon, the insurrection spread to Missolonghi and Patras. On 22 October, the insurrection reached the capital Athens and a provisional government was established, with Rouphos as the Prime Minister. On the following day, the revolutionaries proclaimed the deposition of the royal couple, and convened an assembly for the election of a new monarch.

The royal couple was then brought from Kalamata by the Minister of Police and placed under the protection of a British warship, HMS Scylla. At the same time, the property of the royal couple which remained in the Old Royal Palace was inventoried before being returned to their legitimate possessors. Advised by ambassadors of the Great Powers, Otto and his queen left Greece and went into exile. In spite of everything, the king refused to abdicate and did not envision his departure as being definitive.

See also
 3 September 1843 Revolution
 1862 Greek head of state referendum
 1862 Greek legislative election

References

Bibliography
 

Conflicts in 1862
1862
1862 in Greece
Hellenic Parliament
History of Greece (1832–1862)
19th century in Athens
October 1862 events
1860s coups d'état and coup attempts
1860s in Greek politics